Stauromatodon is an extinct genus of diapsid reptile, possibly related to Saurosphargidae, from the Middle Triassic Erfurt Formation of Germany. It contains a single species, Stauromatodon mohli.

References 

Diapsids
Fossil taxa described in 2021